RockOut Fest (formerly called Maquinaria Festival) is a music festival of different styles but mainly rock, born in São Paulo in 2008. After two versions there, the Chilean producer Transistor bought and exported the brand to Chile to do it October 9, 2010, at the Club Hípico in Santiago de Chile, with bands like Queens of the Stone Age, Incubus, Linkin Park and Pixies as headliners, as well as sideshows with Rage Against the Machine, The Mars Volta and Suicidal Tendencies. After the first successful release, a second version was released in 2011 with Faith No More, Megadeth, Alice In Chains, Down, Chris Cornell, Stone Temple Pilots, Snoop Dogg, Sonic Youth, Primus and Damian Marley This time as headliners on 12 and 13 November.

After two versions, the Transistor producer decided to change the venue for 2012, to Club de Campo Las Vizcachas with camping including and signs alliances with producers in Argentina and Mexico to make local versions, with similar line-up, between 1 and November 11, 2012. In Mexico City (1, 2 and 3), Guadalajara (3 and 4), Buenos Aires (8 and 9) to finish in Santiago de Chile on November 10–11. Marilyn Manson, Slayer, The Prodigy, and Calle 13 are headliners in all countries along with names like Deftones (except Buenos Aires), Gogol Bordello, Apollo, Mastodon, Stone Sour, Cavalera Conspiracy, Slash (Chile only) and Kiss (Exclusive to Chile).

In August 2014, the Transistor company changed the name of Maquinaria Festival to RockOut Fest, making its first edition only in Santiago de Chile. It has been confirmed to the second edition for September 2016 and the third for November 2017.

Venues 

* This version was made as Sideshow because the artists initially performed at the festival but in the end played two days later

Maquinaria Festival Chile 2010

Maquinaria Festival Chile 2011

Maquinaria Festival Chile 2012

RockOut Fest Chile 2014

RockOut Fest Chile 2016

RockOut Fest Chile 2017

References

Music festivals in Chile
Music festivals established in 2010
Rock festivals in Chile
Spring (season) events in Chile